This is a list of the albums and singles in the discography of Nora Aunor.

Aunor started her career as a singer when she won an amateur singing contest, "Tawag ng Tanghalan", in 1967, earning her the nicknames the "Girl with a Golden Voice" and "Princess of Songs."

In 1968, Aunor was contracted by Alpha Records upon the recommendation of singer Carmen Soriano. In her seven years with Alpha Records, Aunor was able to set all-time high record sales which up to this day has not been surpassed. At the height of her popularity as a recording artist in the late 1960s and early 1970s, local records soared up to 60% of national sales, according to Alpha Records Philippines.

She is the artist with the most singles in Philippine recording history (with more than 260). Overall she has recorded more than 500 songs. She has notched more than 30 gold singles, a record in the local music industry. With estimated sales of one million units, Aunor's cover of "Pearly Shells" (1971) is one of the biggest-selling singles in the Philippines ever.  She also recorded some 46 hit long-playing albums, and several extended plays.

National Artist for Literature Nick Joaquin once wrote that "The Aunor voice has never been particularly young-girlish. Even at 14, when she pitched it low, the effect was smoky torch. Her teenage fans say that what they like about Nora's voice is that 'it can do anything, wild or sweet.' But it's in the heartbreak songs that the throat really comes through — and the sound is all woman."

National Artist for Music Prof. Andrea Veneracion said about Aunor, "She always has a good voice and over the years, she has developed her own style. Nora in her heyday towered above all other singers not only in terms of popularity but simply because she has a beautiful voice which is what spells the difference even now that many other pop singers have cropped up."

Albums

Studio albums

Extended plays

Aunor recorded and released more than 100 EPs; the following is a partial list.

Soundtrack albums

Compilation albums

Holiday albums

Live albums

Collaboration albums

Singles

Notable singles

Aunor recorded over 260 singles, the most in Philippine music history; the following is a list of some of her most notable songs.

Movie, TV show and stage play theme songs

Other albums

As a performer on a compilation album

As a guest performer in an album

As a performer in an advertisement jingle and more

Music awards and recognition

Awit Awards

The first award ceremony was organized by the Awit Awards Executive Committee. After that, the Philippine Academy of Recording Arts and Sciences (PARAS) took charge for the next two years. Since 1989, it has been spearheaded by PARI (the Philippine Association of the Record Industry, Inc.)

Philippine Recording Distributors Association (PREDA)

Star Awards for Music (Philippine Movie Press Club)

Organisasyon ng Pilipinong Mang-aawit (OPM)

ref:

Katha Award

See also

 List of awards and nominations received by Nora Aunor
 Honorific nicknames in popular music

References

Discographies of Filipino artists
Discography